Dubitatio is a fungal genus in the family Massariaceae. According to the 2007 Outline of Ascomycota, the placement of the genus in this family is uncertain. This is a monotypic genus, containing the single species Dubitatio dubitationum, found in temperate South America.

References

Fungi of South America
Monotypic Dothideomycetes genera
Pleosporales